Achaion Limen was a port town of ancient Aeolis. 

Its site is located near Haci Ahmet Ağa, Asiatic Turkey.

References

Populated places in ancient Aeolis
Former populated places in Turkey